Gossip is idle talk about the personal affairs of others.

Gossip may also refer to:

Film and television
 Gossip (1923 film), an American silent film directed by King Baggot
 Gossip (unfinished film), an unfinished 1982 British drama directed by Don Boyd
 Gossip (2000 American film), a teen drama directed by Davis Guggenheim
 Gossip (2000 Swedish film), a comedy/drama directed by Colin Nutley
 Gossip (TV series), a 2021 American documentary series
 "Gossip" (Desperate Housewives), a television episode
 "Gossip" (The Office) (U.S.), a television episode

Music
 Gossip (band), an American indie rock band

Albums
 Gossip (Paul Kelly and the Coloured Girls album) or the title song, 1986
 Gossip (Sleeping with Sirens album) or the title song, 2017
 Gossip, an EP by Breathe Carolina, 2007
 The Gossip, an EP by Gossip, 2000

Songs
 "Gossip" (Lil Wayne song), 2007
 "Gossip" (Vanessa Amorosi song), 2011
 "Gossip" (Måneskin song), 2023
 "Gossip", by Nadine Coyle from Nadine, 2018
 "Gossip", by Tame Impala from Currents, 2015
 "Gossip", by You Me at Six from Take Off Your Colours, 2008

Other uses
 Alex Gossip (1862–1952), Scottish trade union leader and political activist
 George H. D. Gossip (1841–1907), American-English chess master and writer
 Gossip (software), an instant messaging client for Unix-like operating systems
 Gossip (video game), a 1983 experimental Atari 400 game by Chris Crawford
 Gossip protocol, a structured interchange of messages between agents running on a set of computers in a network
 Chinese whispers, or gossip, a party game
 Gossip, a 2002 nonfiction book by Lori Palatnik
 Gossip: A Journal of Lesbian Feminist Ethics, published by Onlywomen Press 1986–1988

See also 
Gossip Girl (disambiguation)
 Chat (disambiguation)
 Gossypium, the cotton genus